Demick may refer to:

Barbara Demick, American journalist
Irina Demick (1936–2004), French actress
Patricia Demick (born 1972), Chilean boxer